Gertrude Herbert Institute of Art is located in Augusta, Georgia, in the home of former Augusta mayor and United States senator Nicholas Ware. Olivia Herbert founded the institute in 1937. The original name for the institute was the Augusta Art Club; it was later renamed in memorial to Olivia Herbert's daughter, Gertrude Herbert Dunn. The two primary missions of the institute are art education and visual arts exhibition.

Education activity
Facilitating the art education mission of the institute is a certification by the Georgia Council of Arts as a Teacher Professional Learning (TPL) provider current as of 2007. Among other certified providers is Emory University.

Ware's Folly: The building housing the institute

Construction of the home in which the institute is housed was completed in 1818. The building is now listed on the National Register of Historic Places. Built in the Federal style the house is notable for its three-story elliptical staircase. The building bears the nickname Ware's Folly, which derives from the high cost of the construction, $40,000 in 1818 or c. $12 million in 2007, and the extravagant interior detailing.

References

Notes

External links

 Homepage for the Institute
Augusta, Georgia, a National Park Service Discover Our Shared Heritage Travel Itinerary

1937 establishments in Georgia (U.S. state)
National Register of Historic Places in Augusta, Georgia
Federal architecture in Georgia (U.S. state)
University and college buildings on the National Register of Historic Places in Georgia (U.S. state)
Houses completed in 1818
Art museums and galleries in Georgia (U.S. state)
Art schools in Georgia (U.S. state)
Arts centers in Georgia (U.S. state)
Tourist attractions in Augusta, Georgia
Education in Augusta, Georgia
Buildings and structures in Augusta, Georgia